Sì may refer to:

 Sì (dessert), a traditional Chinese dessert
 Sì (operetta), a 1919 operetta in three acts composed by Pietro Mascagni
 Sì (album), by Andrea Bocelli (2018)
 "Sì" (Gigliola Cinquetti song), the Italian entry to the Eurovision Song Contest 1974
 "Sì", a 1985 single by Carmen Russo
 Si (surname) (姒), a Chinese surname

See also 
 Si (disambiguation)
 Sí (Julieta Venegas album), a 2003 album by Julieta Venegas